Al Halt (November 23, 1890 – January 22, 1973) was an infielder for Major League Baseball in  1914, 1915, and 1918.

Sources

1890 births
1973 deaths
Major League Baseball infielders
Baseball players from Ohio
Brooklyn Tip-Tops players
Cleveland Indians players
Major League Baseball third basemen
Major League Baseball shortstops
Beaumont Oilers players
Kansas City Blues (baseball) players
Beaumont Exporters players
San Antonio Bears players